Hugo Grau (Marktl, 15 April 1899 - 27 June 1984) was a German veterinarian and animal anatomist.

He was the co-founder of the World Association of Veterinary Anatomists and the European Association of Veterinary Anatomists.

In 1933 Grau signed the Vow of allegiance of the Professors of the German Universities and High-Schools to Adolf Hitler and the National Socialistic State.

Literatural works
 Grundriss der Histologie und vergleichenden mikroskopischen Anatomie der Haussäugetiere (with P. Walter), 1968
 Lehrbuch der Histologie und vergleichenden mikroskopischen Anatomie der Haustiere (with O. Knöling), 101960

1899 births
1984 deaths
German veterinarians
German anatomists
Officers Crosses of the Order of Merit of the Federal Republic of Germany